Phyllis Gutiérrez Kenney (born 1936) is an American Democratic politician. She is a former member of the Washington House of Representatives, representing the 46th district. Kenney was born in Hardin, Montana.

In 1996, she ran unsuccessfully for Secretary of State of Washington. In 1997, Governor Mike Lowry appointed her to serve the remainder of Ken Jacobsen's term after Jacobsen's appointment to the Washington State Senate.

References

Hispanic and Latino American state legislators in Washington (state)
Hispanic and Latino American women in politics
Living people
Democratic Party members of the Washington House of Representatives
Women state legislators in Washington (state)
1936 births
21st-century American women